The Rhetoric Society of America (RSA) is an academic organization for the study of rhetoric.

The Society's constitution calls for it to research rhetoric in all relevant fields of study, identify new areas of study, encourage experimentation in teaching rhetoric, facilitate professional cooperation and to sponsor the publication of such materials dealing with rhetoric."  The Society is composed of scholars from various disciplines who study rhetoric's history, theory, public practice, and pedagogical methods.

The RSA was established in 1968, by directors that included Edward P. J. Corbett, Wayne C. Booth and Richard Hughes, introducing innovative programs and courses in rhetoric.

In 2008, the American Council of Learned Societies (ACLS) accepted the Rhetoric Society of America as its 70th member learned society. The learned societies of ACLS are national or international organizations in the humanities and related social sciences, accepted on the basis of their "substantial, distinctive, and distinguished contribution" to humanistic scholarship.

In her book Authoring a Discipline: Scholarly Journals and the Post-World War II Emergence of Rhetoric and Composition, Maureen Daly Goggin writes that:

Publications
The Rhetoric Society Quarterly is the organization's official journal. Published four times a year, it features original articles on all areas of rhetorical studies, intended for an interdisciplinary audience of scholars and students who work in communication studies, English studies, philosophy, politics and other fields. It awards its Charles Kneupper Award for the best article of the year. An associate professor at the University of Texas at Arlington, Kneupper organized the society's national conferences until his death in 1989.

The Society also operates the Blogora, a blog for "connecting rhetoric, rhetorical methods and theories, and rhetoricians with public life," hosted by the University of Texas at Austin.

Current and past presidents
Its current president is Michelle Ballif, Department Head of the Department of English at the University of Georgia. Past presidents include Gerald A. Hauser (2002–2003), Professor of Communication at the University of Colorado at Boulder, Patricia Bizzell (2004–2005), Professor of English and Chairperson of the English Department at the College of the Holy Cross, and David Zarefsky (2006–2007), Owen L. Coon Professor of Communication Studies at Northwestern University.

References

External links
Paraphrase Online

Academic organizations based in the United States
Organizations established in 1968
Rhetoric
Member organizations of the American Council of Learned Societies
Learned societies of the United States